The 1966–67 CMJHL season was the inaugural season of the Canadian Major Junior Hockey League.  It was formed by five members of the former Saskatchewan Junior Hockey League along with the Edmonton Oil Kings and the Calgary Buffaloes and was considered an "outlaw league" by the Canadian Amateur Hockey Association.

The CMJHL was made up of seven teams based in Alberta and Saskatchewan that completed a 56 game schedule.  The Moose Jaw Canucks won the President's Cup.

Regular season

Final standings

Scoring leaders
Note: GP = Games played; G = Goals; A = Assists; Pts = Points; PIM = Penalties in minutes

1967 CMJHL playoffs

Quarterfinals
Regina defeated Weyburn 4 games to 1
Estevan defeated Saskatoon 3 games to 2, with 2 ties

Semifinals
Moose Jaw defeated Edmonton 3 games to 2, with 4 ties
Regina defeated Estevan 4 games to 1

Finals
Moose Jaw defeated Regina 4 games to 1

All-star game
The 1966–67 WCJHL all-star game was held in Calgary, Alberta, with the Reds defeating the Whites, 7–0 before a crowd of 1,000.

Awards

All-star teams

See also
1966 in sports
1967 in sports

References
whl.ca
 2005–06 WHL Guide

Western Hockey League seasons
CMJHL